Socialite Evenings is Shobha De's first novel. It describes Mumbai high society and explores the lives of bored, rich housewives trapped in loveless marriages and engaging in ill-fated extramarital affairs, smug selfish husbands who use their wives more for social respectability than for love, fashionable parties, false spiritual leaders, and a portrait of the general moral, spiritual and intellectual bankruptcy and decadence of the elite who have traded their traditional culture for Westernization and materialism.

Plot summary 

Karuna, the main protagonist and narrator is caught up in a drab, boring life that she seeks to escape by writing memoirs. Her memoirs are successful and she achieves a measure of fame and pride in herself as she becomes an active socialite and eventually uses her newfound prominence as a celebrity to get herself a position as an advertising copywriter and creator of a television series.

Literary significance & criticism 

Socialite Evenings was a critical disaster but a commercial success, likely due in part to its racy and controversial content, something that was unusual in India. It was criticized by traditional elements in Indian society. Although a novel, it closely parallels Shobha De's own rise to fame and appeared to be partially autobiographical.

Release details 

 1989, India, Penguin, New Delhi , Pub date ? ? 1989, paperback
 1995, India, Penguin, New Delhi ISBN ?, Pub date ? ? 1995, paperback (as part of The Shobha De Omnibus)

References 

Novels by Shobhaa De
Novels set in Mumbai
1989 Indian novels
1989 debut novels